Biandukou is a pass with an elevation of over 3,500 m in the Altyn-Tagh, China. It links Minle County of Gansu in the north and Qilian County of Qinghai in the south.

Biandukou has been an important pass in history. It could have been through here that the Chinese Buddhist traveler Faxian arrived in Zhangye, Gansu in the end of the 4th century AD. During the Sui Dynasty, it was known as Dadoubagu. Emperor Yang of Sui went to Zhangye in 609 AD through Dadoubagu, where many people died from cold weather.

References 

Mountain passes of China
Landforms of Gansu
Landforms of Qinghai